James Bonar (27 September 1852 – 18 January 1941) was a Scottish civil servant, political economist and historian of economic thought. He was born in Perth but brought up, from the age of four, in Glasgow where his father was a Church of Scotland Minister. This clerical background extends to two uncles, both ministers who 'came out' in the disruption of 1843, both later serving terms as Moderator of the Free Church General Assembly. From Glasgow Academy Bonar graduated MA in Mental Philosophy from Glasgow University in 1874. He followed the same lengthy undergraduate career that Adam Smith pursued more than a century before gaining a Snell Exhibition to Balliol College, Oxford from which he graduated with a first in 1877.

A major early influence was the moral philosopher, Edward Caird: first as Professor at Glasgow and then as Master of Balliol.  Together with his family background that influence helps explain Bonar's decision to spend the next three years teaching economics in the newly established University Extension Movement in the East End of London.  In 1881 he began a career in the civil service only retiring (to live in Hampstead) from his final position, as Deputy Manager of the Ottawa branch of the Royal mint, in 1919 at the age of 67.

In 1886, with J. H. Muirhead and others, Bonar was instrumental in establishing the London Ethical Society, the first ethical society in the UK. Although the LES became the London School of Ethics and Philosophy in 1897 (which was later absorbed in the London School of Economics), it was the first of a growing number of ethical societies which prompted the formation of the Union of Ethical Societies in 1896, known today as Humanists UK.

He was awarded an LLD from Glasgow University in 1887, and an honorary doctorate from Cambridge University in 1935.

Major publications
 Parson Malthus, 1881.
 Malthus and his Work, 1885.
 Letters of David Ricardo to Thomas Robert Malthus: 1810–1823 (ed.), 1887.
 "Austrian economists and their view of value", 1888, QJE

 Philosophy and Political Economy, 1893 (3rd ed. 1922; 4th ed. 1927)
 Catalogue of Adam Smith's Library, 1894.
 
 Letters of David Ricardo to Hutches Trower and Others: 1811–1823 (with J.H. Hollander), 1899.
 Disturbing Elements in the Study and Teaching of Political Economy, 1911.
 "Knapp's theory of money", 1922, EJ
 Ricardo's Ingot Plan, 1923, EJ
 "Memories of F.Y. Edgeworth", 1926, EJ
 The Tables Turned. A Lecture and Dialogue on Adam Smith and the Classical Economists, 1926.
 "Ricardo on Malthus", 1929, EJ
 Theories of Population from Raleigh to Arthur Young, 1931

References

• Shirras, G F 'Obituary: James Bonar', Economic Journal vol. 51, April 1941, pp. 145–56.
 "Bonar, James" in The New Palgrave: A Dictionary of Economics, Eatwell, Milgate, Newman (eds.), 1987.
 M. Blaug (ed.) – Who's who in economics (3d edition), 1999.
• "Bonar, James" in Rutherford D (ed.) The Biographical Dictionary of British Economists' vol.1, Theommes Continuum, 2004,pp. 123–4.

External links
 
 
 
 

1852 births
1941 deaths
19th-century British  economists
19th-century Scottish historians
20th-century British economists
Alumni of Balliol College, Oxford
Alumni of the University of Glasgow
Historians of economic thought
People educated at the Glasgow Academy
Writers from Glasgow
Writers from Perth, Scotland
Royal Canadian Mint presidents
Scottish civil servants
Scottish economists
20th-century Scottish historians